This list enumerates High-rise buildings and Skyscrapers in the city of Delhi, the capital and the largest metropolis of India, along with its adjoining NCR areas.  Currently there are more than 5,200 high-rise buildings in the Delhi NCR area with thousands more under construction. Supernova Spira which topped out in 2022 is currently the tallest building in Delhi NCR with a height of   consisting of 80 floors.

Tallest buildings 

This list ranks buildings in Delhi NCR that stand at least , based on standard height measurement or are 35 floors tall, as of February 2023.  This includes spires and architectural details but does not include antenna masts. Only completed buildings and under-construction and on-hold buildings that have been topped out  are included.

Tallest buildings (under-construction) 
This list ranks buildings that are under construction in the Delhi NCR and are planned to rise at least  or 25 floors or more. Buildings that are only approved, on hold or proposed are not included in this table.

Timeline of tallest buildings of Delhi NCR

See also

 List of tallest buildings in India
 List of tallest buildings in Gurgaon
 List of tallest buildings and structures in South Asia
 List of tallest buildings in different cities in India
 List of tallest buildings
 M3M Atrium Sector 57 Gurgaon

Notes

References 

Delhi
Tallest buildings
Buildings and structures in Noida
Buildings and structures in Gurgaon
National Capital Region (India)